Crocus robertianus  is a species of flowering plant in the genus Crocus of the family Iridaceae. It is a cormous perennial native to northwestern and central Greece.

References

robertianus